Section 27 of the National Heritage Resources Act (NHRA) of South Africa provides for places of historic or cultural importance to be designated national heritage sites. This came into effect with the introduction of the Act on 1 April 2000, when all former national monuments declared by the former National Monuments Council and its predecessors became provincial heritage sites as provided for in Section 58 of the Act.

Both national and provincial heritage sites are protected under the terms of Section 27 of the NHRA, and a permit is required to work on them.  National heritage sites are declared and administered by the national heritage resources authority, SAHRA;  provincial heritage sites fall within the domain of the various provincial heritage resources authorities.

The SAHRA logo is used to mark national heritage sites.

Current sites
Currently proclaimed national heritage sites are

 Bolts Farm 
 Boschendal 
 Cape Winelands Cultural Landscape
 Coopers Cave
 Drimolen
 Charlotte Maxeke Grave
 Gladysvale
 Gondolin, Broederstroom
 Kaditshwene Cultural landscape
 Kromdraai fossil site
 Madiba House (inside Drakenstein Correctional Centre)
 Makapans Valley and Limeworks at Makapansgat
 Mapungubwe
 Motsetsi
 Non Pareille 
 Plovers Lake 
 Robben Island 
 Royal Observatory, Cape of Good Hope
 Sarah Baartman Site 
 SAS Pietermaritzburg
 Sterkfontein caves 
 Swartkrans Palaeontological Site 
 Union Buildings
 Voortrekker Monument
 Wonderwerk Cave

See also
 South African Heritage Resource Agency
 List of heritage sites in South Africa
 Provincial heritage site (South Africa)
 Heritage objects (South Africa)

 Provincial heritage resources authorities
 Amafa aKwaZulu-Natali
 Heritage Western Cape
 Northern Cape Heritage Resources Authority

 Previous Heritage conservation authorities
 1923 to 1969 - Historical Monuments Commission
 1969 to 2000 - National Monuments Council (South Africa and Namibia)

References

External links
 Website of the South African Heritage Resource Agency
 Searchable database of declared sites on SAHRIS
National Heritage Resources Act, number 25 of 1999, in online pdf format

Provincial Heritage Resources Authorities:
 Western Cape - Heritage Western Cape
 KwaZulu Natal - Amafa/Heritage KwaZulu Natal 
 Free State - Heritage Free State
 Eastern Cape - Eastern Cape Provincial Heritage Resources Authority
 Mpumalanga - Mpumalanga Provincial Heritage Resources Authority
 Limpopo - Limpopo Heritage Resources Authority 
 North West - North West Provincial Heritage Resources Authority 
 Northern Cape - Ngwao-Boswa Jwa Kapa Bokone
 Gauteng - Provincial Heritage Resources Authority Gauteng

Heritage registers in South Africa
South African heritage resources
Historic sites in South Africa
Heritage registers